Susanne Holmström (born  1947) is a Danish sociologist, best known for her writings on organizational legitimacy based on the systems theory of Niklas Luhmann.

For her dissertation Perspectives & Paradigms: An Intersubjective and a Social Systemic Public Relations Paradigm she was awarded the 1998 EUPRERA award for best European dissertation in public relations. In 2004 she became a full Ph.D. for her thesis The Sensitive Organisation of the Reflective Society.

She has formerly been a board member of EUPRERA and of the steering group of LOKE, a Nordic network for research within organisational legitimisation and communication. She is best known for having developed the so-called reflective business paradigm (Holmström 2004).

In recent years she has been an external lecturer at Roskilde University and in 2011 was appointed Honorary Professor.

Notes

References

External links
 Susanne Holmström - official website

1947 births
Living people
Danish sociologists
Danish women academics